Đông Nam is a rural commune of Đông Sơn District in Thanh Hóa Province, Vietnam.

References

Communes of Thanh Hóa province
Populated places in Thanh Hóa province